
Year 493 BC was a year of the pre-Julian Roman calendar. At the time, it was known as the Year of the Consulship of Auruncus and Viscellinus (or, less frequently, year 261 Ab urbe condita). The denomination 493 BC for this year has been used since the early medieval period, when the Anno Domini calendar era became the prevalent method in Europe for naming years.

Events 
 By place 

 Persian Empire 
 A Phoenician-manned Persian fleet restores Persian control of Cyprus.

 Greece 
 The Athenian people elect Themistocles as archon, the chief judicial and civilian executive officer in Athens. He favours resistance against the Persians.
 Themistocles starts the construction of a fortified naval base at Piraeus, the port town of Athens.
 Among the refugees arriving from Ionia after the collapse of the Ionian Revolt is a chief named Miltiades, who has a fine reputation as a soldier. Themistocles makes him a general in the Athenian army.

 Roman Republic 
 The secession of the plebs concludes.
 The Roman army, led by Postumus Cominius Auruncus defeats the Volsci and the Romans capture the towns of Longula, Pollusca and Corioli.  Gaius Marcius distinguishes himself in the battle for Corioli, and earns the cognomen Coriolanus.
 During his second consulate, the Roman consul Spurius Cassius Vecellinus concludes a treaty with the Latin League, the Foedus Cassianum, confirming Roman primacy in Latium.

 By topic 

 Literature 
 The Athenian poet Phrynicus produces a tragedy on the Fall of Miletus. The Athenian authorities ban the play from further production on the grounds of impiety.

Births

Deaths 
 Agrippa Menenius Lanatus, former Roman consul.
 Cleisthenes

References